Paula Haapakoski (born 3 February 1977) is a Finnish orienteering competitor. She is two times Relay World Champion, from 2006 and 2007, as member of the Finnish winning teams in the World Orienteering Championships.

See also
 Finnish orienteers
 List of orienteers
 List of orienteering events

References

External links
 
 Paula Haapakoski at World of O Runners

1977 births
Living people
Finnish orienteers
Female orienteers
Foot orienteers
World Orienteering Championships medalists